Hindu New Year may refer to:

 Hindu Lunar New Year: Chaitra Navaratri
 Hindu Solar New Year: Mesha Sankranti
 Hindu Financial New Year: Kartik Shukla Pratipada